Jennifer "Jennie" Formby ( Sandle; born 12 April 1960) is a British trade unionist and political figure who served as General Secretary of the Labour Party from 2018 to 2020. She was previously political director and south-east England regional secretary for Unite the Union.

Early life
Born Jennifer Sandle in London, her father served in the Royal Navy in Korea, Suez and Lebanon. She grew up with an older brother and sister in Malta, Bath and Salisbury. She went to Bath High School for Girls then St Helen and St Katharine boarding school in Abingdon, paid for by the Royal Navy from the age of 14. Formby left school with 10 O levels and 3 A levels, but chose not to go to university.

Trade unionism
Formby became a trade unionist when she began her working life in Salisbury at the bookmakers William Hill in the late 1970s, and became a branch secretary in Unite's predecessor, the Transport and General Workers' Union. She later worked for BOC in Southampton, where she became a union shop steward.

Formby became a Transport and General Workers' Union regional officer in 1988. She represented a Southampton University Hospitals NHS Trust nurse in a ground-breaking employment tribunal case in 2004, where the black nurse suffered racial discrimination by being banned from caring for a white baby. Formby became the union's national officer for the food, drink and tobacco sector in 2004. In 2013, she was appointed Unite's political director. In March 2016, Formby moved to the post of regional secretary in south-east England.

Labour Party
Since late 2011, Formby has been a member of the National Executive Committee (NEC) of the Labour Party.

In February 2018, Formby announced she was a candidate to become General Secretary of the Labour Party, shortly after the incumbent, Iain McNicol, resigned. Her main rival, Jon Lansman, the chair of Momentum, dropped out of contention on 11 March, making Formby the frontrunner. 

On 20 March 2018, she was appointed to the role, effective from April 2018. 

She resigned on 4 May 2020, a month following the election of Keir Starmer as new Labour leader, saying "now we have a new leadership team it is the right time to step down". She was succeeded by David Evans.

Personal life
Formby and Len McCluskey had a child in 1991. She married Freddie Formby in 2000 and the couple had two children together and adopted a third.

In March 2019, Formby announced that she was to undergo treatment for breast cancer.

References 

1960 births
Living people
People educated at Bath High School for Girls
People educated at the School of St Helen and St Katharine
English trade unionists
Labour Party (UK) officials
People from Bath, Somerset
People from Salisbury
Unite the Union
English women trade unionists